Nickelodeon HD+ (abbreviated as Nick HD+) is an Indian children's pay television channel based in Mumbai, Maharashtra, India.It is the High definition counterpart of Nickelodeon India and is owned by Viacom 18, a joint venture between Paramount Global and TV18. Original content from original American network are shown only on this channel.

History 
On 5 December 2015, Viacom 18 launched Nickelodeon HD+, the first children's channel in high definition in India. The channel used to air select content from its SD channels along with Nickelodeon international originals. However, in 2018, the HD channel began to focus solely on international Nickelodeon content, thus removing all local content, which only air on the SD channel.

The channel also aired Nickelodeon live action shows under the TeenNick branding but was stopped in February 2017.

The channel telecasted Digimon Adventure tri. after receiving lots of requests from fans after Nickelodeon Sonic removed the Digimon Adventure tri.

After 4 years the channel decided to bring live action shows back starting from 2 August 2021. The channel was also formerly provided in Bangladesh until 2 October 2021, where it was temporarily suspended for not broadcasting in clean feed, along with all other foreign television channels.

Criticism 
The channel received criticism for taking up to 5 years to air new content in India, and usually the last in the world, one example being The Loud House, which premiered 4 years after its US debut.

See also 
Nickelodeon India
Nick Jr. India
Nickelodeon Sonic

References

External links

Children's television channels in India
Indian animation
English-language television stations in India
Television stations in Mumbai
Viacom 18
Television stations in India